Ikäläinen is a Finnish surname. Notable people with the surname include:

Joonas Ikäläinen (born 1982), Finnish footballer
Jukka Ikäläinen (born 1957), Swedish footballer

See also
Ihalainen

Finnish-language surnames